The Visegrad 4 Bicycle Race is a set of one day road bicycle races held annually in Poland, Hungary, Slovakia and the Czech Republic. The races are organized as 1.2 events on the UCI Europe Tour.

Winners

GP Polski

GP Czech Republic

GP Slovakia

Kerékpárverseny

V4 Special Series Debrecen–Ibrány

V4 Special Series Vásárosnamény–Nyíregyháza

References

UCI Europe Tour races
Cycle races in Hungary
Cycle races in the Czech Republic
Cycle races in Slovakia
Cycle races in Poland
2014 establishments in the Czech Republic
2014 establishments in Hungary
2014 establishments in Slovakia
2014 establishments in Poland
Recurring sporting events established in 2014
Spring (season) events in Hungary
Spring (season) events in Slovakia